The Iowa National Guard consists of the:
Iowa Army National Guard and the
Iowa Air National Guard

The Iowa National Guard headquarters is at Camp Dodge in Johnston, several miles north of the state capital Des Moines.  The facility serves double duty as a continuity of government facility for the state of Iowa, as well as hosting the central hub of the state's extensive fiber optic network.

When National Guard troops are called to federal service, the President serves as Commander-in-Chief. The federal mission assigned to the National Guard is: "To provide properly trained and equipped units for prompt mobilization for war, National emergency or as otherwise needed."

The Governor may call individuals or units of the Iowa National Guard into state service during emergencies or to assist in special situations which lend themselves to use of the National Guard. The state mission assigned to the National Guard is: "To provide trained and disciplined forces for domestic emergencies or as otherwise provided by state law."

See also
Iowa State Guard

External links
Bibliography of Iowa Army National Guard History compiled by the United States Army Center of Military History
Iowa National Guard homepage

National Guard (United States)
Military in Iowa
State agencies of Iowa